Mads Clausen (born 10 February 1984) is a retired Norwegian football midfielder.

He came through the youth ranks of Jardar and Stabæk, making his senior first-tier debut for Stabæk in July 2003. He also represented Norway as a youth international. After two seasons in Stabæk he moved on to second-tier Follo, staying with them until the 2010 Norwegian Football Cup Final which Follo lost. The exception was the 2007 season which Clausen played for Jardar, where he also rounded off his career in the 2010s.

References

1984 births
Living people
Sportspeople from Bærum
Norwegian footballers
Stabæk Fotball players
Follo FK players
Norwegian First Division players
Eliteserien players
Association football midfielders
Norway youth international footballers